Cell division cycle-associated protein 3 is a protein that in humans is encoded by the CDCA3 gene.

Interactions
CDCA3 has been shown to interact with SKP1A.

References

External links

Further reading